Golam Musabbir Rakib (born 1 December 1988) simply known as Rakib Musabbir, is a Bangladeshi singer-songwriter, musician and record producer. He became popular as Rakib Musabbir after the release of his first solo album (Jare Amar Mon)'s title track "Jare Amar Mon". According to The New Nation, "He is notable for his fusion of Bengali music with contemporary techno and urban beats, film score, folk, pop, [and] rock."

Biography
He was born in an upper-middle-class Bengali family on 1 December 1988 in the town of Bhairab, Bangladesh. He set up his own in-house studio in Bhairab called RM Music Factory. Rakib Musabbir has been active in the music business from 2007 onwards.

Career
In 2008, he released his first solo album, Jare Amar Mon, a mix of folk and modern electronica music.

In the next few years, Rakib released eight albums: Boishak Elo, his second solo album published by Soundtek in 2010; Madhobi Lata, his first featured album published by Laser Vision in 2010; Jani Tumi, his second featured album published by Laser Vision in 2011; Obhimanai Akash, his 3rd featured album with Asif Iqbal published by A6 and Ganchil in 2012; Sukh Pakhi, his 3rd solo album published by Cd Choice in 2013; Rodela Akash, his 4th featured album published by Cd Choice in 2014; Nondini, his 5th featured album published by Laser Vision in 2014; Valobasha Emoni, his 4th solo album published by Cd Choice in 2014; and his upcoming album Ramu mix (Vol-1) & Sajna is coming soon this year. He has featured new voices and some famous voices in all of his albums. Rakib first Mixed album Jege Otho (Laser Vision 2011).

Album releases

References

 
 
 
 
 

Bangladeshi male musicians
1988 births
Living people